Dan Hornbuckle (born December 26, 1980) is a former American mixed martial artist and a citizen of the Eastern Band of Cherokee tribe. A professional since 2006, Hornbuckle has competed for Bellator, Legacy FC, World Victory Road, and DEEP.

Background
Hornbuckle was born in Mahomet, Illinois and attended Centennial High School where he competed in wrestling and football. Growing up, he faced adversity being Native American, and was often the victim of racism. He began mixed martial arts when he was 24 years old.

Mixed martial arts career
When he first began fighting, Hornbuckle weighed 215 pounds and received his nickname due to the way he dominated his opponents with very little technique but using his strength and toughness. In the early part of his career, Hornbuckle went 19–2 with significant knockout wins against Akihiro Gono and Nick Thompson in Sengoku. These two wins brought his name to international prominence and launched his career in 2009. On Thursday December 17, 2009 Bellator announced the signing of Hornbuckle to a multi-fight Welterweight tournament contract.

At Bellator 15, Hornbuckle defeated Tyler Stinson via first round triangle choke to advance to the semifinals of the Bellator Welterweight Tournament. He then defeated Steve Carl via submission (kimura) at Bellator 19 to advance to the finals of the Bellator Welterweight Tournament. This victory was a candidate for 2010 submission of the year. In the finals, Hornbuckle fought Olympic wrestler, Ben Askren. The fight took place at Bellator 22 on June 17, at the Kansas City Power and Light District in Kansas City, Mo., with Askren winning by unanimous decision. The fight saw Askren implement a dominant top game on the ground that stifled Hornbuckle's bottom game. Hornbuckle made his return to Bellator against former UFC Welterweight Brad Blackburn at Bellator 25 on August 19, 2010.  He won the fight via unanimous decision in what was largely a three-round kickboxing battle. Despite being knocked down in the first round, Hornbuckle recovered and won the next two rounds to win a unanimous decision.

Hornbuckle then participated in the Bellator Season Four Welterweight Tournament. In his opening round fight against Brent Weedman at Bellator 35, Hornbuckle lost a unanimous decision, 29–28 on all three judges scorecards. The fight was notably close and the decision was booed by the crowd after being announced. He was scheduled to fight former Bellator Welterweight Champion Lyman Good at Bellator 44, in Atlantic City, New Jersey. However, a hamstring injury forced Lyman Good off the card, and the bout was scrapped. Hornbuckle entered into the Bellator Season Five Welterweight Tournament. He fought Luis Santos in the opening round held at Bellator 49 and lost the fight via unanimous decision.

After losing two consecutive fights in Bellator, Hornbuckle was released from the promotion along with Wilson Reis.

Over a year later, Hornbuckle returned to MMA competition against Pete Spratt on February 1, 2013 at Legacy FC 17. He won the fight via unanimous decision. Hornbuckle then challenged Yuya Shirai for his DEEP Welterweight Championship on April 26, 2013 at DEEP: Impact 62. He won the fight and the title via unanimous decision. In his next outing, Hornbuckle dropped a majority decision to Dennis Hallman on August 30, 2013 at Titan FC 26. He put his DEEP Welterweight Championship on the line against Ryo Chonan at DEEP: Tribe Tokyo Fight on October 20, 2013. He lost the title via unanimous decision. Hornbuckle then faced Dominique Steele at Driven MMA: One on March 1, 2014. Hornbuckle lost the bout via unanimous decision. Hornbuckle faced Roger Carroll at FTP: Fight Time in the Valley on August 9, 2014. He lost the fight via submission in the first round, suffering his fourth consecutive loss.

Personal life
In addition to being a professional mixed martial artist, Hornbuckle works as a fire suppression system installer. He is married and has three daughters. Hornbuckle opened his own academy, American Top Team WarHawks, in Mahomet, Illinois.

Championships and accomplishments
Bellator MMA
Bellator Season Two Welterweight Tournament Runner Up
DEEP
DEEP Welterweight Championship (One time)

Mixed martial arts record

|-
| 
| align=center|
| Dan Stittgen
| 
| Caged Aggression 35: The Trilogy Night 2
| 
| align=center| 
| align=center| 
| Davenport, Iowa, United States
|
|-
| Win
| align=center| 25–9
| Jacon Luock
| KO (punch)
| Caged Aggression 24: Champions Night 2
| 
| align=center| 2
| align=center| 3:37
| San Antonio, Texas, United States
|Won the CAMMA Welterweight Championship.
|- 
| Loss
| align=center| 24–9
| Roger Carroll
| Submission (choke)
| FTP: Fight Time in the Valley
| 
| align=center| 1
| align=center| 4:37
| Marble, North Carolina, United States
| 
|-
| Loss
| align=center| 24–8
| Dominique Steele
| Decision (unanimous)
| Driven MMA: One
| 
| align=center| 3
| align=center| 5:00
| Canton, Ohio, United States
| 
|-
| Loss
| align=center| 24–7
| Ryo Chonan
| Decision (unanimous)
| DEEP: Tribe Tokyo Fight
| 
| align=center| 3
| align=center| 5:00
| Tokyo, Japan
| Lost the DEEP Welterweight Championship.
|-
| Loss
| align=center| 24–6
| Dennis Hallman
| Decision (majority)
| Titan FC 26
| 
| align=center| 3
| align=center| 5:00
| Kansas City, Missouri, United States
| 
|-
| Win
| align=center| 24–5
| Yuya Shirai
| Decision (unanimous)
| DEEP: Impact 62
| 
| align=center| 3
| align=center| 5:00
| Tokyo, Japan
| 
|-
| Win
| align=center| 23–5
| Pete Spratt
| Decision (unanimous)
| Legacy FC 17
| 
| align=center| 3
| align=center| 5:00
| San Antonio, Texas, United States
| 
|-
| Loss
| align=center| 22–5
| Luis Santos
| Decision (unanimous)
| Bellator 49
| 
| align=center| 3
| align=center| 5:00
| Atlantic City, New Jersey, United States
| Welterweight Tournament Quarterfinal.
|-
| Loss
| align=center| 22–4
| Brent Weedman
| Decision (unanimous)
| Bellator 35
| 
| align=center| 3
| align=center| 5:00
| Lemoore, California, United States
| Welterweight Tournament Quarterfinal.
|-
| Win
| align=center| 22–3
| Brad Blackburn
| Decision (unanimous)
| Bellator 25
| 
| align=center| 3
| align=center| 5:00
| Chicago, Illinois, United States
| 
|-
| Loss
| align=center| 21–3
| Ben Askren
| Decision (unanimous)
| Bellator 22
| 
| align=center| 3
| align=center| 5:00
| Kansas City, Missouri, United States
| Welterweight Tournament Final.
|-
| Win
| align=center| 21–2
| Steve Carl
| Submission (kimura)
| Bellator 19
| 
| align=center| 1
| align=center| 2:31
| Grand Prairie, Texas, United States
| Welterweight Tournament Semifinal.
|-
| Win
| align=center| 20–2
| Tyler Stinson
| Submission (triangle choke)
| Bellator 15
| 
| align=center| 1
| align=center| 2:03
| Uncasville, Connecticut, United States
| Welterweight Tournament Quarterfinal.
|-
| Win
| align=center| 19–2
| Nick Thompson
| TKO (punches)
| World Victory Road Presents: Sengoku 10
| 
| align=center| 2
| align=center| 1:30
| Saitama, Saitama, Japan
| 
|-
| Win
| align=center| 18–2
| Akihiro Gono
| KO (head kick)
| World Victory Road Presents: Sengoku 9
| 
| align=center| 3
| align=center| 2:50
| Saitama, Saitama, Japan
| 
|-
| Win
| align=center| 17–2
| Joe Alexander
| KO (punches)
| TFC: Hornbuckle vs. Alexander
| 
| align=center| 1
| align=center| 0:46
| Hammond, Indiana, United States
| 
|-
| Win
| align=center| 16–2
| Nabil Khatib
| Submission (rear-naked choke)
| Raw Combat: Resurrection
| 
| align=center| 1
| align=center| 3:58
| Calgary, Alberta, Canada
| 
|-
| Loss
| align=center| 15–2
| Mike Pyle
| Submission (triangle choke)
| World Victory Road Presents: Sengoku 2
| 
| align=center| 1
| align=center| 4:52
| Tokyo, Japan
| 
|-
| Win
| align=center| 15–1
| Andrew Buckland
| Submission (armbar)
| HCF: Crow's Nest
| 
| align=center| 1
| align=center| 3:34
| Gatineau, Quebec, Canada
| 
|-
| Win
| align=center| 14–1
| Courtney Ray
| Submission (armbar)
| HOOKnSHOOT: BODOGFight Women's Tournament
| 
| align=center| 1
| align=center| 1:25
| Evansville, Indiana, United States
| 
|-
| Win
| align=center| 13–1
| Piotr Jakaczynski
| KO (head kick)
| BodogFIGHT: Vancouver
| 
| align=center| 1
| align=center| 1:53
| Vancouver, British Columbia, Canada
| 
|-
| Win
| align=center| 12–1
| Matt Shaw
| Submission (arm-triangle choke)
| Total Fight Challenge 8
| 
| align=center| 2
| align=center| 2:53
| Hammond, Indiana, United States
| 
|-
| Win
| align=center| 11–1
| Courtney Ray
| TKO (punches)
| HOOKnSHOOT: Live
| 
| align=center| 1
| align=center| 2:49
| Evansville, Indiana, United States
| 
|-
| Win
| align=center| 10–1
| Jamie Toney
| Decision (unanimous)
| HOOKnSHOOT: Live
| 
| align=center| 3
| align=center| 5:00
| Evansville, Indiana, United States
| 
|-
| Win
| align=center| 9–1
| Wayne Bogard
| Submission (armbar)
| HOOKnSHOOT: Live
| 
| align=center| 1
| align=center| 2:34
| Evansville, Indiana, United States
| 
|-
| Win
| align=center| 8–1
| Alex Carter
| Submission (arm-triangle choke)
| Total Fight Challenge 7
| 
| align=center| 1
| align=center| 0:35
| Hammond, Indiana, United States
| 
|-
| Win
| align=center| 7–1
| Brent Weedman
| Submission (triangle choke)
| LOF 12: Black Tie Battles
| 
| align=center| 2
| align=center| 3:31
| Indianapolis, Indiana, United States
| 
|-
| Win
| align=center| 6–1
| Max Fowler
| Submission (verbal)
| CFC 1: Explosion
| 
| align=center| 1
| align=center| 0:30
| Tinley Park, Illinois, United States
| 
|-
| Win
| align=center| 5–1
| Wayne Bogard
| Submission (arm-triangle choke)
| IHC 11: Apocalypse
| 
| align=center| 1
| align=center| 0:36
| Hammond, Indiana, United States
| 
|-
| Win
| align=center| 4–1
| Justin Wilcox
| TKO (punches)
| Total Fight Challenge 6
| 
| align=center| 1
| align=center| 1:20
| Hammond, Indiana, United States
| 
|-
| Win
| align=center| 3–1
| Andy Normington
| KO (punches)
| Madtown Throwdown 8
| 
| align=center| N/A
| align=center| N/A
| Madison, Wisconsin, United States
| 
|-
| Loss
| align=center| 2–1
| Nate Homme
| Submission (triangle choke)
| Madtown Throwdown 8
| 
| align=center| N/A
| align=center| N/A
| Madison, Wisconsin, United States
| 
|-
| Win
| align=center| 2–0
| Steve Conley
| TKO (punches)
| Duneland Classic 4
| 
| align=center| 1
| align=center| N/A
| Portage, Indiana, United States
| 
|-
| Win
| align=center| 1–0
| Mike Bodziak
| TKO (punches)
| Total Fight Challenge 5
| 
| align=center| 1
| align=center| N/A
| Hammond, Indiana, United States
|

References

External links

1980 births
American male mixed martial artists
Eastern Band Cherokee people
Mixed martial artists from Illinois
Welterweight mixed martial artists
Mixed martial artists utilizing wrestling
Mixed martial artists utilizing Brazilian jiu-jitsu
Living people
People from Champaign County, Illinois
Native American sportspeople
American practitioners of Brazilian jiu-jitsu
People awarded a black belt in Brazilian jiu-jitsu
Deep (mixed martial arts) champions
20th-century Native Americans
21st-century Native Americans